Daniel 'Dani' Bautista Pina (born 25 February 1981 in Seville, Andalusia) is a Spanish retired footballer who played as a left-back.

Honours
Recreativo
Segunda División: 2005–06

Oviedo
Segunda División B: 2014–15

References

External links

1981 births
Living people
Spanish footballers
Footballers from Seville
Association football defenders
La Liga players
Segunda División players
Segunda División B players
Sevilla Atlético players
Sevilla FC players
SD Eibar footballers
RC Celta de Vigo players
Ciudad de Murcia footballers
Recreativo de Huelva players
Hércules CF players
Girona FC players
UD Almería players
Racing de Santander players
Real Murcia players
Real Oviedo players